Peng Bo (born June 10, 1962 in Wuhan) is a Chinese sprint canoer who competed in the mid-1980s. At the 1984 Summer Olympics in Los Angeles, he was eliminated in the repechages of the K-2 1000 m event.

Peng was born in Wuhan, after his retirement of a competing canoe sporter, He serves as a Senior Coach, the men's kayak coach in the Water Sports Administration Center of Hubei.

References

Sports-Reference.com profile

1962 births
Living people
Sportspeople from Wuhan
Chinese sports coaches
Olympic canoeists of China
Canoeists at the 1984 Summer Olympics
Chinese male canoeists